Aleksandr Gennadyevich Kurosh (January 19, 1908 – May 18, 1971) was a Soviet mathematician, known for his work in abstract algebra. He is credited with writing The Theory of Groups, the first modern and high-level text on group theory, published in 1944.

He was born in Yartsevo, in the Dukhovshchinsky Uyezd of the Smolensk Governorate of the Russian Empire and died in Moscow. He received his doctorate from the Moscow State University in 1936 under the direction of Pavel Alexandrov. In 1937 he became a professor there, and from 1949 until his death he held the Chair of Higher Algebra at Moscow State University. In 1938, he was the PhD thesis adviser to his fellow group theory scholar Sergei Chernikov, with whom he would develop important relationships between finite and infinite groups, discover the Kurosh-Chernikov class of groups, and publish several influential papers over the next decades. In all, he had 27 PhD students, including also Vladimir Andrunakievich, Mark Graev, and Anatoly Shirshov.

Selected publications
 Teoriya Grupp (Теория групп), 2 vols., Nauk, 1944, 2nd edition 1953.
 German translation: Gruppentheorie. 2 vols., 1953, 1956, Akademie Verlag, Berlin, 2nd edition 1970, 1972.
 English translation: The Theory of Groups, 2 vols., Chelsea Publishing Company, the Bronx, tr. by K. A. Hirsch, 1950, 2nd edition 1955.
 Vorlesungen über Allgemeine Algebra. Verlag Harri Deutsch, Zürich 1964.
 Zur Theorie der Kategorien. Deutscher Verlag der Wissenschaften, Berlin 1963.
 Kurosch: Zur Zerlegung unendlicher Gruppen. Mathematische Annalen vol. 106, 1932.
 Kurosch: Über freie Produkte von Gruppen. Mathematische Annalen vol. 108, 1933.
 Kurosch: Die Untergruppen der freien Produkte von beliebigen Gruppen. Mathematische Annalen, vol. 109, 1934.
 A. G. Kurosh, S. N. Chernikov, “Solvable and nilpotent groups”, Uspekhi Mat. Nauk, 2:3(19) (1947), 18–59.
 A. G. Kurosh, "Curso de Álgebra Superior", Editorial Mir, Moscú 1997, traducción de Emiliano Aparicio Bernardo (in Spanish)

See also
Kurosh subgroup theorem
Kurosh problem

References

External links

1908 births
1971 deaths
20th-century Russian mathematicians
People from Yartsevo
People from Dukhovshchinsky Uyezd
Academic staff of Moscow State University
Academic staff of Saratov State University
Moscow State University alumni
Recipients of the Order of the Red Banner of Labour
Recipients of the USSR State Prize
Algebraists
Number theorists
Topologists
Russian mathematicians
Soviet mathematicians
Burials at Vvedenskoye Cemetery